6500 may refer to:
 The year 6500 AD
 The number 6500

AMD A8-6500, a CPU released in 2013
Intel Core i5-6500, a CPU released in 2015